Wittgert is an Ortsgemeinde – a community belonging to a Verbandsgemeinde – in the Westerwaldkreis in Rhineland-Palatinate, Germany.

Geography

The community lies in the Westerwald between Koblenz and Siegen on the borders of the Kannenbäckerland (“Jug Bakers’ Land”, a small region known for its ceramics industry). Flowing by the community is the Saynbach, which belongs to the Rhine drainage basin. Through the community itself flows the Röttgesbach, which empties into the Saynbach. Wittgert belongs to the Verbandsgemeinde of Ransbach-Baumbach, a kind of collective municipality. Its seat is in the like-named town.

History
In 1298, Wittgert had its first documentary mention as Widechinrode.

Politics

The municipal council is made up of 12 council members who were elected in a majority vote in a municipal election on 13 June 2004.

Economy and infrastructure

Autobahn A 3 (Cologne–Frankfurt) with its Mogendorf interchange (AS 38) lies 6 km away. The nearest InterCityExpress stop is the railway station at Montabaur on the Cologne-Frankfurt high-speed rail line.

References

External links
 Wittgert 

Municipalities in Rhineland-Palatinate
Westerwaldkreis